Park Min-su (born 12 August 1970) is a South Korean former cyclist. He competed at the 1988, 1992 and the 1996 Summer Olympics.

References

1970 births
Living people
South Korean male cyclists
Olympic cyclists of South Korea
Cyclists at the 1988 Summer Olympics
Cyclists at the 1992 Summer Olympics
Cyclists at the 1996 Summer Olympics
Place of birth missing (living people)
Asian Games medalists in cycling
Asian Games gold medalists for South Korea
Asian Games bronze medalists for South Korea
Cyclists at the 1990 Asian Games
Cyclists at the 1994 Asian Games
Cyclists at the 1998 Asian Games
Medalists at the 1990 Asian Games
Medalists at the 1994 Asian Games
20th-century South Korean people
21st-century South Korean people